Qarah Bolagh Rural District is a rural district (dehestan) in Sheshdeh and Qarah Bolagh District, Fasa County, Fars Province, Iran. At the 2006 census, its population was 18,196, in 4,232 families.  The rural district has 15 villages.

References 

Rural Districts of Fars Province
Fasa County